Samuel Davis (July 5, 1944 – September 10, 2019) was an American football player who played as a guard for the Pittsburgh Steelers of the National Football League (NFL) from 1967 to 1979.

College
Davis played football at Allen University in Columbia, South Carolina.

Steelers
Davis was an undrafted rookie in 1967. He did not start any game during his first three years of play, but started at the left offensive guard position for the National Football League's Pittsburgh Steelers from 1970 to 1979. In 1970, Chuck Noll's second year as head coach, Davis replaced Larry Gagner and started all 14 games. From 1970 to 1979, he played next to left offensive tackle Jon Kolb and the two went on to win four Super Bowl rings together with the Steelers (Super Bowls IX, X, XIII, and XIV). However, Davis injured his foot before Pittsburgh's first Super Bowl and Jim Clack started in his place in Super Bowls IX and then retained the starting job throughout the 1975 season and Super Bowl X. In 1980, he was replaced by Ray Pinney.

Death
On September 10, 2019, at approximately 6:50 am, Davis, aged 75, was reported missing from the New Life Care Personal Home in McKeesport, Pennsylvania. He had been suffering from dementia and was legally blind. Later that evening, authorities announced that Davis was found deceased inside of the facility. Davis' family later stated that he had died of a heart attack.

References

1944 births
2019 deaths
People from Ocilla, Georgia
Players of American football from Georgia (U.S. state)
American football offensive guards
Allen Yellow Jackets football players
Allen University alumni
Pittsburgh Steelers players